The S33 is a regional railway line of the S-Bahn Zürich on the Zürcher Verkehrsverbund (ZVV), Zürich transportation network, and is one of the network's lines connecting the cantons of Zürich and Schaffhausen.

Route 
 

The line runs from the northwest of the canton of Zürich from Winterthur and heads for Schaffhausen. At both terminal stations, connections to InterCity and InterRegio trains as well as other S-Bahn services exist.

Stations 
 Winterthur
 Hettlingen
 Henggart
 Andelfingen
 Marthalen
 Dachsen
 Schloss Laufen am Rheinfall
 Neuhausen
 Schaffhausen

Rolling stock 

S33 services are operated by RABe 511 units, except for weekday services to Schaffhausen which are run by Re 450 class locomotives pushing or pulling double-deck passenger carriages.

Until 2018, the S33 services were operated by THURBO rolling stock (Stadler GTW units).

Scheduling 
The train frequency is usually hourly and the trip takes 33 minutes. The S33 runs hourly, but offers half-hourly services at all stations in combination with the S12 (reduced services on weekends and evenings).

See also 

 Rail transport in Switzerland
 Trams in Zürich

References 

 ZVV official website: Routes & zones

Zürich S-Bahn lines
Canton of Schaffhausen
Transport in the canton of Zürich